Pontoria is an unincorporated community in Ponto Lake Township, Cass County, Minnesota, United States, near Backus.

The community is located between Pine River and Longville near the junction of State Highways 84 (MN 84) and 87 (MN 87).

Pontoria is located along Highway 84.  It is part of the Brainerd Micropolitan Statistical Area.

References

Unincorporated communities in Cass County, Minnesota
Unincorporated communities in Minnesota
Brainerd, Minnesota micropolitan area